{{DISPLAYTITLE:C27H32O15}}
The molecular formula C27H32O15 (molar mass: 596.53 g/mol, exact mass: 596.1741 u) may refer to:

 Eriocitrin
 Neoeriocitrin